Nathan Meyer is a Paralympian athlete from South Africa competing mainly in category T13 sprint events.

Nathan first competed at the 2000 Summer Paralympics in the F13 long jump and won both the 100m and 200m T13 gold medals.  In 2004 he attempted to defend his gold medals but finished with just a silver in the T13 200m.

References

Paralympic athletes of South Africa
Athletes (track and field) at the 2000 Summer Paralympics
Athletes (track and field) at the 2004 Summer Paralympics
Paralympic gold medalists for South Africa
Paralympic silver medalists for South Africa
Living people
Medalists at the 2000 Summer Paralympics
Medalists at the 2004 Summer Paralympics
Year of birth missing (living people)
Paralympic medalists in athletics (track and field)
South African male sprinters
South African male long jumpers
20th-century South African people
21st-century South African people
Visually impaired sprinters
Visually impaired long jumpers
Paralympic sprinters
Paralympic long jumpers